Seven Hills is an electoral district of the Legislative Assembly in the Australian state of New South Wales. It is represented by Mark Taylor of the Liberal Party.

It includes the suburbs of Constitution Hill, Northmead, Old Toongabbie and Winston Hills and parts of Seven Hills, Baulkham Hills, Blacktown, Kings Langley, Glenwood, Lalor Park, Pendle Hill, Prospect, Toongabbie, Wentworthville and Westmead.

History

Seven Hills was established for the first time in 1981 but it was abolished in 1991. It was recreated from 2015 as a result of the 2013 redistribution. It is named after and including the Sydney suburb of Seven Hills.

The second incarnation of Seven Hills largely consisted of areas from the abolished seat of Toongabbie, which had historically been a  stronghold before Labor's near-meltdown in west Sydney in the 2011 election. In the election, the Labor margin was reduced from a comfortably safe 14.5 percent to an extremely marginal 0.3 percent. The transfer of traditionally pro-Labor voting areas to Blacktown and Prospect, and the addition of equally pro- areas from Baulkham Hills significantly altered the political composition of the electorate, giving the Liberals a notional margin of 8.8 percent–on the stronger side of fairly safe. The sitting member for Toongabbie was former Labor Premier Nathan Rees, who retired at the 2015 election.

As a result of a redistribution in 2021, Seven Hills will be abolished at the 2023 election and largely replaced by Winston Hills.

Members for Seven Hills

Election results

References

Electoral districts of New South Wales
Constituencies established in 1981
Electoral District of Seven Hills
Constituencies disestablished in 1991
Electoral District of Seven Hills
Constituencies established in 2015
Electoral District of Seven Hills